Roundtree is a surname. Notable people with the name include: 

 Dovey Johnson Roundtree (1914–2018), American civil rights activist, minister, and attorney
 Raleigh Roundtree (born 1975), American football player
 Red Roundtree (1905–1990), American banjo player
 Richard Roundtree (born 1942), American actor, best known for Shaft
 Roy Roundtree (born 1989), American football coach and former player 
 Saudia Roundtree (born 1976), American basketball coach and former player
 Shay Roundtree (born 1977), American actor

See also
Rountree
Rowntree (disambiguation)